Beles may refer to:
Beles, Ethiopia, a tabiya or municipality in the Tahtay Koraro district of the Tigray Region of Ethiopia. The tabiya centre is Beles village itself.
Beles River and Gilgil Beles, a river and a town in Metekel Zone of Benishangul-Gumuz region of Ethiopia
Beles Hydroelectric Power Plant in Ethiopia
A name for the Opuntia ficus-indica fruit in Eritrea and Ethiopia
Beleš (Serbian: Белеш), a village in Serbia
Belasica (Beles), a mountain between Greece, Bulgaria and the Republic of Macedonia